Peace Dove is an allegorical sculpture in Nasimi Culture and Leisure Park in Sumgayit, Azerbaijan. The Peace Dove is the symbol of Sumgayit.

The monument was designed by the Chief Artist of Sumgayit Vagif Nazirov and architect A. Guliyev. It is made of solid concrete. It was raised in 1978 as a symbol of peace in a newly functioning public park on coastline city of Sumgayit.

In 2008, the monument and the whole park went through an extensive renovation works.

On stamps

References

1978 sculptures
Allegorical sculptures
Birds in art
Architecture in Azerbaijan
Parks in Azerbaijan
Peace symbols
Tourist attractions in Sumgait
Protected areas of Azerbaijan
Concrete sculptures in Azerbaijan